Diane Legault (born July 21, 1956) is a Quebec dentist and politician.

Early life and education 
Born in Montreal, Quebec, Legault received a Doctor in Dentistry from Université de Montréal in 1979 and a M.B.A. from Université de Sherbrooke in 1995.

Career 
Legault was director of professional services for the Ordre des dentistes from 1996 to 1998 and executive director and secretary from 1998 to 2003.

Legault served as the member of the National Assembly for Chambly in Quebec. She represented the Quebec Liberal Party and resigned on November 15, 2006. On November 7, 2006, she was elected president of the Ordre des dentistes du Québec, the professional order representing all the dentists in Quebec, for a five-year term. She was the first woman to hold this position.

References

External links

1956 births
Canadian dentists
Living people
Politicians from Montreal
Quebec Liberal Party MNAs
Université de Montréal alumni
Université de Sherbrooke alumni
Women MNAs in Quebec
21st-century Canadian politicians
21st-century Canadian women politicians